María Delgado Nadal (born 8 October 1997) is a blind Paralympic swimmer from Spain who has competed in several national and international championships.

Personal 
Delgado is from the Aragon region of Spain. She has a vision impairment called congenital toxoplasmosis.  As a result of the condition, she only has peripheral  vision since she was born.

Swimming 
Delgado is an S12 classified swimmer, and is a member of the  Aragua AD swimming club.  She is affiliated with ONCE.

Delgado competed at the 2010 Spanish Age Swimming Championships for blind and visually impaired, where she finished first in all but one of the races she competed in.  The remaining race she finished third in. In 2010, she competed at the Paralympic Swimming Championship of Spain by Autonomous Communities, where she won two bronze medals while representing Aragon.

Competing at the 2011 Paralympic Swimming Championship of Spain by Autonomous Communities, Delgado earned a gold medal in the 50 meter backstroke and another in the 100 meter freestyle.  She also earned a silver in the 100 meter backstroke and a bronze in 50 meter freestyle. In 2011, she competed in the swimming component of the Sports Association Championships Aragón Aragua. She competed at the 2011 National Olympiad in the under-16 group.

Delgado was part of project AXA in 2012, which is a program designed to help develop young Spanish sportspeople into elite athletes on the international level.  She took part in a camp in December run by the program which put an emphasis on the technical aspects of swimming.  By that year, she was considered a potential competitor at the 2016 Summer Paralympics. In 2012, she competed at the Paralympic Swimming Championship of Spain by Autonomous Communities, where she finished third in the women's S12 100m butterfly event.  That year, she also competed in the age championships where she earned a gold medal in the 100 meter butterfly and a silver in the 100 freestyle.

In 2013, Delgado trained with the CAR Higher Sports Council in Madrid alongside 25 other sportspeople.
She competed at the 2013 Paralympic Swimming Championship of Spain by Autonomous Communities, where she won a pair of silver medals. She competed at the 2013 Swimming Championship of Catalonia, hosted by the Sabadell Swimming Club, where she was one of nine Spanish swimmers to set a qualifying time for the World Championships. As a 15-year-old, she competed at the 2013 IPC Swimming World Championships in Montreal, Canada in the 100 backstroke, 100 butterfly, 100 free and 200 medley.  In preparation for the competition, she trained at the High Performance Center in Madrid.  Her goal going into the competition was to gain competitive experience in preparation for the 2016 Summer Paralympics.

Notes

References

External links 
 
 

1997 births
Living people
Spanish female backstroke swimmers
Spanish female butterfly swimmers
Spanish female freestyle swimmers
Spanish female medley swimmers
Paralympic swimmers of Spain
Medalists at the 2016 Summer Paralympics
Medalists at the World Para Swimming Championships
Medalists at the World Para Swimming European Championships
Paralympic medalists in swimming
Paralympic bronze medalists for Spain
Swimmers at the 2016 Summer Paralympics
S12-classified Paralympic swimmers